Alexander "Sascha" Zverev (born 20 April 1997) is a German professional tennis player. He has been ranked by the Association of Tennis Professionals (ATP) as high as world No. 2, and was continuously ranked in the top 10 from July 2017 to November 2022. Zverev's career highlights include titles at the 2018 and the 2021 ATP Finals, and a gold medal at the 2020 Tokyo Olympics. He has won 19 ATP Tour titles in singles and two in doubles, and reached a major final at the 2020 US Open, finishing runner-up to Dominic Thiem. Zverev is the only active player outside of the Big Four with five Masters 1000 titles.

Zverev is a former junior world No. 1, and won a junior major singles title at the 2014 Australian Open. He had an early breakthrough on the professional tour as well, becoming one of the youngest Challenger Tour title winners in history at the age of 17. As a teenager, Zverev won two ATP titles and upset then-world No. 3 Roger Federer on grass. At 20 years old, he became the youngest player to debut in the top 20 since Novak Djokovic. At the Laver Cup, Zverev has played an instrumental role in Team Europe's early success in the competition, winning the clinching matches in 2018 and 2019.

Early life and background
Alexander "Sascha" Zverev was born on 20 April 1997 in Hamburg, Germany to Russian parents, Irina Zvereva and Alexander Mikhailovich Zverev. His older brother Mischa, born nearly a decade earlier, is also a professional tennis player. Both of Sascha's parents were professional tennis players for the Soviet Union. His father, ranked as high as No. 175 in the world, became the top-ranked men's player nationally, while his mother was the fourth-highest ranked women's player in the Soviet Union. They both moved from Sochi to the capital to train at the CSKA Moscow military-run tennis club. The Soviet government often restricted their players from competing outside the country, an impediment that limited how high either of Sascha's parents could rise in the world rankings. With the collapse of the Soviet Union imminent, Irina went to Germany to compete at a tournament in 1990, with her husband accompanying as her coach. While in Germany, they were offered jobs as tennis instructors. After initially declining, they accepted an offer to work at the Uhlenhorster Hockey Club in Hamburg the following year and ended up settling in the country.

Zverev started playing tennis at the age of 3. Since Sascha began playing tennis at a very young age, he has said, "One day, when I was I think one year and five months old, I just picked up a little racket, and I was starting to push the ball all over our apartment, and since then, they took me out on the court. I enjoy it still, I enjoyed it back then." When he was five years old, he started to play tennis at least half an hour each day. Sascha was extremely competitive as a child. His brother Mischa said, "He would not understand or accept that he was losing" when the two would play against each other. He would never want to leave the court unless he won the match. Sascha also played hockey and football as a child but decided to focus only on tennis around the age of 12 after an early-round loss at a high-level international junior tournament in Florida.

When Sascha was young, his mother was his primary coach while his father was focused on coaching his brother. He has said, "I think I have pretty good technique, which my mum did at a young age, so credit to her for that. My backhand, in particular, is 100 per cent down to my mum.” While his mother had a more relaxed teaching style, his father "had a very Soviet way of doing physical training sessions" that involved doing timed drills for fixed numbers of repetitions. Sascha's coaches aimed for him to have a riskier, aggressive playing style built around hitting the ball with pace and finishing points quickly. This was a big contrast from how he played around age 12 when his style centred around being an "unbelievable fighter" from the baseline in part because he was too slow to go to the net. Initially, Sascha struggled to change his playing style. He "made a lot of errors" and lost to opponents who excelled at keeping points alive. However, his father stuck with this strategy, saying, "We must practice fast tennis, aggressive tennis. If you lose today it’s no big deal. You must think about the future."

Junior career

Zverev played his first junior match in January 2011 at the age of 13 at a grade 4 tournament in Poland. He is a former world No. 1 junior. He entered his first event on the International Tennis Federation (ITF) junior circuit in early 2011 when he was 13. Near the beginning of 2012, Zverev won his first ITF title at the Fujairah Junior Championships, a low-level Grade 4 tournament in the United Arab Emirates. He would pick up a lower level Grade 5 title at the Oman International Junior 2 a few weeks later, which led him to begin competing in higher-level events shortly before his 15th birthday. He did not have much success at tournaments that were Grade 2 and above until the following year when he reached back-to-back doubles finals with Spencer Papa at the Grade A Copa Gerdau and the Grade 1 USTA International Spring Championships.

Zverev's early-season success in doubles proved to be the precursor of a major improvement in singles as well. During the European clay court season, he won his first Grade 1 title over Andrey Rublev at the Open International Junior de Beaulieu-sur-Mer. He followed up that performance with his first Grade A title at the Trofeo Bonfiglio a month later, becoming the youngest boys' singles champion in the tournament's history. He also finished runner-up at the 2013 French Open to Cristian Garín. Zverev had some grass court success as well, finishing runner-up to Nick Kyrgios at the Junior International Roehampton. However, he needed to retire at Wimbledon due to a shoulder injury. Zverev came close to reaching another major boys' singles final at the 2013 Junior US Open, but was defeated by the eventual champion Borna Ćorić in the semifinals. This success was enough for him to take over the No. 1 ranking in late October. Before the end of the season, Zverev also represented Germany in the Junior Fed Cup, leading them to a fourth-place finish. His last tournament of the year was the Grade A Orange Bowl, where he was defeated by Stefan Kozlov in the semifinals. As the top-ranked junior at the end of the season, he was named the ITF Junior World Champion, becoming the youngest boys' champion since Donald Young in 2005.

Zverev played just two tournaments in 2014, both in Australia in January. He won the singles events at both tournaments, the first of which came against Australian Omar Jasika at the Traralgon Junior International. At the Australian Open, he was able to defeat Kozlov, who was seeded second, to finish his junior career with a first major title.

Junior Grand Slam results – Singles:

Australian Open: W (2014)
French Open: F (2013)
Wimbledon: 3R (2013)
US Open: SF (2013)

Professional career

2011–14: Challenger title and ATP semifinal at 17

As the age of 14, Zverev entered qualifying at three different tournaments, including the 2011 Moselle Open on the ATP Tour, but lost all of his matches. He won his professional main draw debut against compatriot Christian Lichtenegger at a Futures event in Germany in August 2012. At the end of the year, he made his first professional final, finishing runner-up to Florian Reynet at an ITF $10K event in Florida. Zverev continued to focus on the juniors in 2013 and did not reach another pro-level final that year, but he did make his main draw debut on the ATP Tour in July, losing to Roberto Bautista Agut at his hometown tournament, the International German Open. He also made his ATP Challenger Tour debut, losing to Máximo González at the Meerbusch Challenger in August.

After winning the boys' singles title at the 2014 Australian Open, Zverev shifted his focus to his professional career, only playing in pro events the rest of the year. Initially, he struggled on the pro tour, failing to qualify for the main draw at his first five events of the season. He did not win a main draw match until he recorded a single victory at the Heilbronner Neckarcup Challenger, his tenth event of the year. One of his losses was a retirement against his brother Mischa. Zverev made his first professional breakthrough in July when he won the Braunschweig Challenger for his first professional title, despite entering the tournament with just one career Challenger-level match win and no top 100 victories. Three of the players he defeated were in the top 100, including his first-round opponent No. 87 Tobias Kamke, his semifinal opponent No. 56 Andrey Golubev, and his final opponent No. 89 Paul-Henri Mathieu.

At the age of 17 years and 2 months, he became the youngest player to win a Challenger title since Bernard Tomic in 2009 and the twelfth youngest in history. Zverev followed up this title with a breakthrough at the ATP Tour level. He entered the International German Open having never won an ATP match but managed to reach the semifinals. He recorded four match wins at the event, including his first career victory against Robin Haase and his first top 20 victory over No. 16 Mikhail Youzhny before losing to No. 7 David Ferrer. He became the first 17-year old to defeat a top 20 opponent since Richard Gasquet in 2004 and the first to make a semifinal since Marin Čilić in 2006. Zverev had risen from No. 665 to No. 285 after his Challenger title, and his ATP 500 Series semifinal appearance took him to No. 161 in the world. He finished the season ranked No. 136.

2015: ATP doubles final, top 100

At the beginning of the season, Zverev was still ranked too low to receive direct entry into the main draws of ATP Tour events, which forced him to continue playing Challenger events through July. He also needed to enter qualifying for ATP events throughout the year. Zverev did not qualify for either of the first two major singles events of the season. He was able to qualify for his first Masters event at the Miami Open and reached the second round. During the clay-court season, Zverev partnered with his brother Mischa to reach his first career ATP final in doubles at the Bavarian International Tennis Championships. The Zverev brothers finished runner-up to top-seeded Alexander Peya and Bruno Soares. Later that month, he won his second career Challenger title at the Heilbronn Neckarcup to crack the top 100 of the ATP rankings.

With a higher ranking, Zverev was directly accepted into Wimbledon. A week before the tournament, he took part in the Boodles Challenge exhibition and surprisingly upset world No. 1 Novak Djokovic in straight sets. Zverev backed up this performance in his Grand Slam tournament main draw debut, defeating Teymuraz Gabashvili in a tight match that lasted until 9–7 in the fifth and final set. He lost in the next round to Denis Kudla. Zverev opted to play on clay after Wimbledon and reached another ATP semifinal at the Swedish Open to put him back in the top 100 after one week out. In August, Zverev returned to the United States and competed in two US Open Series events. He notably upset No. 14 Kevin Anderson at the Citi Open en route to the quarterfinals. Zverev's brief rankings drop in July meant that he needed to qualify for the US Open. He succeeded, but lost his opening round match to compatriot Philipp Kohlschreiber in five sets. Zverev won just one more main draw match the rest of the season and ended the year ranked No. 83 in the world. As the youngest player in the top 100, he was named the ATP Newcomer of the Year.

2016: First ATP title, Federer upset, top 20

Zverev's first ATP event of the year was the 2016 Australian Open, where he had a difficult draw against world No. 2 Andy Murray and was only able to win six games in his opening match. He bounced back at the Open Sud de France, reaching the semifinals in the singles event and his second career final with his brother in the doubles event. During the singles event, he upset No. 13 Marin Čilić, the highest-ranked player he had defeated in an official match at the time. Zverev then produced a strong result at the Indian Wells Masters, where he defeated two top 30 players. In the fourth round, he nearly upset No. 5 Rafael Nadal. Zverev had a match point while he was serving for the final set, but missed a routine forehand volley and then proceeded to lose 14 of the remaining 15 points in the match. He commented on the match point that, "I missed probably the easiest shot I had the whole match." Back in Europe, Zverev was able to recover as he reached his first ATP singles final at the Open de Nice Côte d'Azur, finishing runner-up to No. 15 Dominic Thiem, the top seed and defending champion. Thiem also defeated him in the third round of the French Open.

Zverev's next breakthrough came during the grass court season at the Halle Open, where he upset world No. 3 Roger Federer in the semifinals, ending Federer's streak of ten consecutive appearances in the final while competing at the tournament. He was also the first teenager to defeat Federer since Murray nearly a decade earlier. Nonetheless, he finished runner-up at the event to veteran compatriot Florian Mayer. After this final, he entered the top 30 for the first time and stayed ranked in the 20s for the rest of the season. Despite being seeded at a major tournament for the first time, Zverev could then only match his best major singles result at Wimbledon, again falling to Berdych. During the US Open Series, he reached the semifinals of the Washington Open, but lost his opening round matches at both Masters events. He was then upset in the second round of the US Open by Dan Evans.

After the US Open, Zverev returned to Europe and won his first career ATP title at the St. Petersburg Open. He recorded his first win over No. 9 Berdych in the semifinals, and No. 3 Stan Wawrinka in the final, coming back from 0–3 down in the third set. At his next event, he then defeated No. 10 Thiem in the first round of the 2016 China Open for the first time in four tries this year. In doing so, Zverev became the first teenager to record three consecutive victories against top ten opponents since Boris Becker in 1986. Zverev's third round appearance at the Shanghai Masters then helped him rise to No. 20 in the ATP rankings, making him the youngest player to debut in the top 20 since Novak Djokovic in 2006.

2017: Two Masters titles, world No. 3

During the 2017 season, Zverev greatly improved his results at the higher level tournaments on the ATP Tour except for the four major events. At the Australian Open, Zverev again pushed Rafael Nadal to the brink, but ultimately lost in five sets. His next ATP tournament was the Open Sud de France, where he won both the singles and doubles events. He and his brother defeated Fabrice Martin and Daniel Nestor for Alexander's first doubles title. The following month, he made his first Masters quarterfinal at the Miami Open, upsetting No. 3 Stan Wawrinka along the way. Nick Kyrgios defeated him at both Masters events that month.

After a slow start to the clay court season, Zverev won two more titles in May, the first of which came at home in Germany at the Bavarian International Tennis Championships. He then followed up a second Masters quarterfinal at the Madrid Open with his first Masters title at the Rome Masters. He defeated Novak Djokovic in the final to become the youngest Masters champion since Djokovic in 2007 and the first such champion born in the 1990s. With the title, he also entered the top 10 for the first time. Despite his triumph in Rome, he lost his opening round match at the French Open. During the grass court season, Zverev made another singles final and again faced Federer at the Halle Open, but could not defeat him this time. He and his brother also finished runner-up in the doubles event to Łukasz Kubot and Marcelo Melo. At Wimbledon, he achieved his best result at a major event to date, ultimately losing to the previous year's runner-up Milos Raonic in a tight five set match.

Back on hard courts, Zverev won his last two titles of the season in August. He won the Washington Open as well as a second consecutive Masters title at the Canadian Open, only dropping a single set at each tournament in each of his opening matches. Notably, he needed to save three match points in his first match in Canada against Richard Gasquet, including a 49 shot rally. He then defeated Roger Federer in the final to become the first player outside of the Big Four to win multiple Masters titles in the same season since David Nalbandian in 2007. Despite this success, he was upset in the second round of the US Open by fellow Next Gen player Borna Ćorić. At the end of the season, Zverev qualified for both the inaugural Next Generation Finals as one of the top seven 21-and-under players, and the ATP Finals as one of the top eight players in the world. He opted to skip the former event to focus on the latter. At the ATP Finals, Zverev was grouped with Roger Federer, Marin Čilić, and Jack Sock. He defeated Čilić in his first match, but lost his final two matches and did not advance out of his round robin group. Zverev finished the year ranked No. 4, peaking at No. 3 right before the ATP Finals, and accumulated five ATP titles from just six finals.

2018: Tour Finals champion, first major quarterfinal

Zverev maintained his top 5 ranking throughout the year. However, he still did not deliver any high-calibre results at the major tournaments. He was upset at the Australian Open by reigning Next Gen Finals champion and No. 59 Chung Hyeon in five sets in the third round. Zverev stated that issues at majors were "definitely not physical" when asked if his problems were physical or mental, and also attribute this lack of success to the extra pressure he was putting on himself at these events. Zverev did not reach his first final of the year until early April at the Miami Masters. Despite taking the first set of the final, he finished runner-up to American John Isner, who had never previously won a Masters title.

Zverev continued his Masters success into the clay-court season, reaching the semifinals at the Monte Carlo Masters, winning his third career Masters title at the Madrid Open, and making the final at the Rome Masters. In Madrid, he defeated Dominic Thiem in the final to become the only active player outside of the Big Four to have won three Masters titles. He came close to winning back-to-back Masters events, going up a break in the third set against Nadal at the Italian Open. However, Nadal was able to recover and win the final five games of the match after a rain delay. Zverev had also defended his title at the Bavarian International Tennis Championships in his only other French Open tune-up to help build up a 13 match win streak that lasted until the Italian Open final. He capped off his excellent clay court season by reaching his first major quarterfinal at the French Open. He needed to win three five-set matches to get that far before Thiem ended his run while he was faced with a hamstring injury.

Up until the year-end championships, Zverev struggled to build on his early season success. He lost in the third round at both Wimbledon and the US Open, and his best result at the four remaining Masters events was a semifinal at the Shanghai Masters. He was able to defend his title at the Washington Open, his only title during this period. Zverev also reached two more doubles finals with his brother, but did not win either of them. At the end of the season, Zverev qualified for both the Next Generation Finals and the ATP Finals for the second consecutive year, again choosing to only compete at the latter event. He was placed in a group with Novak Djokovic, Marin Čilić, and John Isner. This year, Zverev was able to advance out of the group, only losing to No. 1 Djokovic in the round robin. He faced Federer in the semifinals and defeated him in straight sets to set up a rematch with Djokovic. Despite being a heavy underdog and having just lost to Djokovic earlier in the week, Zverev won the final in straight sets for the tenth and biggest title of his career. He became the youngest tour champion since Djokovic a decade earlier and the first German to win the season-ending championships since Boris Becker in 1995. This was also Zverev's first victory over a current world No. 1 player.

2019: Early season struggles, Masters runner-up, ATP Finals semifinal

Zverev opened his 2019 season with a fourth round appearance at the 2019 Australian Open, defeating Jérémy Chardy in five sets in the second round before losing to Milos Raonic in straight sets. Zverev next played at the Mexican Open and finished runner-up to Nick Kyrgios. Following this tournament, he did not win more than one match at any of his next six events, a streak that ended with two match wins at the Madrid Open. Nonetheless, Zverev finished the clay court season strong. The week before the French Open, he won his only title of the year at the Geneva Open, defeating Nicolás Jarry in the final after saving two match points in the third set tiebreak. He then went on to defeat No. 12 Fabio Fognini and reach his second consecutive quarterfinal at the French Open, where he lost to Novak Djokovic. Zverev did not follow through on that success into the grass court season, where his best result was a quarterfinal at the Halle Open. He was upset in the first round at both the Stuttgart Open and Wimbledon, the latter of which to qualifier Jiří Veselý. Zverev attributed his early season struggles to being distracted by a legal dispute with his former agent Patricio Apey, with whom he had split from in the offseason.

Zverev began to turn his season around following Wimbledon. He reached the semifinals of the German Open and the quarterfinals at the Canadian Open. He then reached the last 16 at the US Open for the first time, where he lost to seed No. 20 Diego Schwartzman to continue his lack of success at the major tournaments. He had also fallen out of the top 5 in early August for the first time in nearly two years. Zverev's best result of the season came at the Shanghai Masters. He upset No. 3 Roger Federer in the quarterfinals before finishing runner-up to No. 4 Daniil Medvedev, who was playing in his sixth consecutive final. This performance helped him qualify for the ATP Finals at the end of the year. At the event, Zverev was drawn into a round-robin group with Rafael Nadal, Stefanos Tsitsipas, and Daniil Medvedev. He defeated Nadal for the first time in his opening match before losing to Tsitsipas. He then won his match against Medvedev, which he had needed to win to advance via the tiebreak criteria. Nonetheless, he could not defend his title, losing to Dominic Thiem in the semifinals. Zverev finished the season at No. 7 in the world.

2020: US Open final & Australian Open semifinals
Zverev began his 2020 season at the inaugural ATP Cup, playing singles matches against Alex De Minaur, Stefanos Tsitsipas, and Denis Shapovalov; losing all three.

He was seeded seventh at the 2020 Australian Open. He first defeated Marco Cecchinato in straight sets; after the match, he pledged to donate all his prize money from the tournament to relief efforts for the ongoing bushfires if he won the title, a total of A$4.12 million. He then defeated Egor Gerasimov, Fernando Verdasco, and 17th seed Andrey Rublev to reach the quarterfinals without dropping a set. There, he defeated 15th seed Stan Wawrinka in four sets to reach his first major singles semifinal, where he lost against fifth seed Dominic Thiem in four sets.

At the US Open, Zverev was seeded fifth. He defeated Kevin Anderson in four sets, then beat 19-year old Brandon Nakashima in four sets. In the third round, he beat Adrian Mannarino in four sets before beating Alejandro Davidovich Fokina in straight sets. In the quarterfinals, he beat Borna Coric in four sets to reach his second major semifinal. There, he lost the first two sets to Pablo Carreno Busta, but came back to win the match in five; this was his first-ever match win from two sets down. He thus advanced to his first major final, where he faced Dominic Thiem. He became the runner-up, losing the final in a final-set tiebreaker despite leading by two sets and twice coming within two points of the title in the final set.

Zverev was seeded 6th at the French Open. He beat Dennis Novak, Pierre-Hugues Herbert, and Marco Cecchinato, before losing in four sets to Jannik Sinner.

In October, he won two consecutive ATP 250 events in Cologne, which took place in the 2020 ATP Tour because of the cancellation of several tournaments due to the COVID-19 pandemic. In the finals, he defeated Félix Auger-Aliassime and Diego Schwartzman, both in straight sets.

Zverev then reached the final of the Paris Masters, beating Nadal in straight sets in the semifinals, where he lost to Daniil Medvedev in three sets.

In the ATP Finals, Zverev was eliminated in the group stage after a three-set win over Diego Schwartzman, and straight-set losses to Djokovic and the eventual champion Medvedev.

2021: Six ATP titles including Olympic gold and ATP Finals, 300th Wins

Zverev began his season in February with the ATP Cup, where he represented Germany with Jan-Lennard Struff, Kevin Krawietz and Andreas Mies to reach the semi-finals. In his first Grand Slam tournament appearance at the 2021 Australian Open, he defeated Marcos Giron, Maxime Cressy, Adrian Mannarino and Dušan Lajović. His run ended in the quarterfinals, where he lost to the eventual champion and world No. 1 Novak Djokovic. In March his first tournament was in Rotterdam, where he lost in the first round to Kazakh Alexander Bublik.  He continued his performances in Acapulco, where he won his 14th ATP title by defeating Stefanos Tsitsipas in the final. At the tournament in Miami, he lost in the second round to Finland's Emil Ruusuvuori.

At his first tournament in 2021 on clay in Monte Carlo, Zverev finished in the third round, losing to David Goffin.  In Munich, he reached the quarterfinals, losing to the 107th ranked tennis player in the world, Ilya Ivashka.

At the Madrid Open, Zverev defeated Rafael Nadal, Dominic Thiem, and Matteo Berrettini en route to his fourth Masters 1000 title and 15th career title. At the same tournament, he also reached his first semifinal in doubles at a Masters 1000, partnering with compatriot Tim Pütz, but withdrew from the match. He reached the quarterfinals of the Masters 1000 in Rome, losing to eventual tournament winner Rafael Nadal. In his second Grand Slam tournament of the year – in Paris, where he was seeded No. 6 – he won against Oscar Otte, Roman Safiullin, Laslo Đere, Kei Nishikori and Alejandro Davidovich Fokina. In the semifinal, he played Stefanos Tsitsipas, to whom he lost after a 5-set battle.

Zverev's first appearance on grass started with a tournament at home in Halle – he lost in the second round to the eventual tournament winner Ugo Humbert. At Wimbledon, seeded No. 4, he equaled his best achievement at the tournament to date – reaching the fourth round for a second time. Along the way he defeated Tallon Griekspoor, Tennys Sandgren and Taylor Fritz. He was defeated in the fourth round by Felix Auger-Aliassime in five sets. Following this run he returned to the top 5 after 2 years on 12 July 2021.

At the Olympics, Zverev beat Yen-hsun Lu, Daniel Elahi Galán, Nikoloz Basilashvili and Jérémy Chardy to reach the semifinals. In the semifinals, despite being a set and a break down against world No. 1 Novak Djokovic, Zverev rallied to break back and won eight games in a row on his way to win in three sets. He defeated Karen Khachanov in straight sets in the final to claim the Olympic gold medal. Zverev became the first German man to win a gold medal in singles and the first to win a medal since Tommy Haas won his silver medal at the 2000 Sydney Olympics.

Following the Olympics, Zverev reached his second Masters 1000 final of the year at the 2021 Western & Southern Open after defeating Lloyd Harris, Guido Pella, Casper Ruud and Stefanos Tsitsipas after a close three-set battle in the semifinal. Zverev had not won a match at the tournament in six prior appearances. He beat Andrey Rublev for the 17th title of his career and the fourth of the season, in 59 minutes, the shortest match in the tournament history.

At the US Open, Zverev sought to claim his first major title following his run to the final the previous year. He reached the semifinals following wins over Jack Sock and Lloyd Harris. There, he lost to Novak Djokovic in five sets despite taking the first set, ending his career-high 16-match win streak stretching back to the Olympics.

Zverev was seeded 3rd at the 2021 BNP Paribas Open, where he reached the quarterfinals. On the way, he defeated Jenson Brooksby, Andy Murray and Gaël Monfils. He lost to Taylor Fritz, despite having two match points.

At the Erste Bank Open in Vienna, seeded second, he defeated Filip Krajinovic and Alex De Minaur to reach the quarterfinals. The victory over De Minaur gave Zverev his 300th ATP tour match win. He then beat Félix Auger-Aliassime and Carlos Alcaraz to reach the final where he won his fifth title of the year and 18th overall, defeating Frances Tiafoe in straight sets.

Zverev was the fourth seed at the 2021 Rolex Paris Masters. He received a bye into the second round, where he defeated Dušan Lajović. He defeated next sixteenth seed Grigor Dimitrov in the third round and sixth seed Casper Ruud in the quarterfinals. He lost in the semifinals to second seed Daniil Medvedev in straight sets. As a result of this run he equaled his singles career-high ranking of World No. 3 on 8 November 2021.

For a fifth successive season, Zverev qualified for the 2021 ATP Finals in Turin, as the third seed. He began his campaign begin by defeating home favourite Matteo Berrettini who retired with an injury. On his way to the title he defeated the top two seeds Djokovic and Medvedev in the semifinals and finals respectively. Due to this win, he became the only player active to have won multiple ATP Finals titles (2) other than Djokovic and Roger Federer, with 5 and 6, respectively.

2022: First top-10 win at a major, world No. 2, ankle injury

Zverev played in the 2022 Australian Open, where he reached the fourth round, being defeated by fourteenth seed, Denis Shapovalov.

In the 2022 Acapulco Open, Zverev played in what was the record latest match ever played, defeating Jenson Brooksby at 4:55 A.M. He was then defaulted from the tournament ahead of his following match against Peter Gojowczyk for violently and repeatedly hitting the umpire's chair with his racket after his loss in doubles.

He lost his first match at the Indian Wells Masters in singles against Tommy Paul but reached the semifinals in doubles with Andrey Golubev. At the 2022 Miami Open, he lost in the quarterfinals to Casper Ruud.

He improved his performance at the 2022 Monte-Carlo Masters by reaching the semifinals defeating Jannik Sinner before losing to eventual champion Stefanos Tsitsipas. At the 2022 Mutua Madrid Open he returned to defend his title. He reached the semifinals with a straight set win over Felix Auger-Aliassime in the quarterfinals, after a tough three sets match win over Marin Cilic in the second round and Lorenzo Musetti's retirement in the third round. He took his revenge on Monte-Carlo champion and fourth seed Stefanos Tsitsipas to reach his third final at this Masters. He improved his ATP Head2Head record to 4–7 against Tsitsipas, earning his first clay-court win against him in the process. In the final, he was defeated by Carlos Alcaraz. At the 2022 Italian Open, he reached the semifinals, defeating Cristian Garín to face Tsitsipas again for the third consecutive time at this Masters level in the clay court season. He lost in the semifinals to Tsitsipas. They were the only players to reach the semifinals at all three Masters 1000 tournaments on clay in the season.

At the French Open, Zverev matched his semifinal result from the previous year, defeating Alcaraz in the quarterfinals in what was his first top-10 victory at a major after 12 attempts. In his semifinal match against Rafael Nadal, he retired 3 hours and 13 minutes into the match after rolling his right ankle and tearing all three lateral ligaments. He was rolled off the court in a wheelchair. Zverev informed that the injury would cause him to miss the 2022 Wimbledon Championships and on 8 June 2022 underwent surgery to repair the torn ligaments in his ankle. Despite his exit at Roland Garros, he reached a career-high ranking of world No. 2 on 13 June 2022. In September, he was due to return for the Davis Cup play but suffered a new injury, a bone edema, and withdrew from competition for the rest of the season.

2023
Despite battling through to the second round in 5 sets in his return to tennis at Australia, Zverev lost in the second round of the Australian Open.

Team competitions

Laver Cup
Zverev took part in the inaugural Laver Cup in Prague in 2017. He accrued four points by winning both of his singles matches for Team Europe as they defeated Team World 15–9. He played a more crucial role in 2018 and 2019, winning the clinching matches in both editions against Kevin Anderson and Milos Raonic respectively. In the 2021 edition in Boston, he defeated John Isner in three sets in his only match in Team Europe's 14–1 win.

Davis Cup
Zverev made his Davis Cup debut for Germany against the Czech Republic in 2016. He faced No. 7 Tomáš Berdych in his debut match and took a two sets to one lead before ultimately losing in five sets. After the Czech Republic won the doubles rubber while Kohlschreiber won both singles matches, Zverev faced Lukáš Rosol in a decisive fifth rubber. Rosol won the match easily to send the Czech Republic into the next round. In the 2017 against Belgium, Zverev recorded his first career match win in the competition against Arthur De Greef, but lost the doubles rubber with his brother as well as his second singles match to Steve Darcis. Belgium won the tie 4–1. Zverev won his first Davis Cup tie in 2018, winning both of his singles matches against Alex de Minaur and Kyrgios to lead Germany to a 3–1 victory over Australia. In the quarterfinals, Germany took a 2–1 lead against Spain behind Zverev's win over David Ferrer and a victory in doubles. However, Spain ultimately won the tie on the final day after Zverev was unable to defeat Nadal and Kohlschreiber lost a tight five-set match to Ferrer.

In 2019, the format of the Davis Cup was changed to have eighteen countries competing in the finals over a single week in November, all but six of which were decided through a qualifying round in February. Germany was placed in the qualifying round and drawn against Hungary. Zverev participated and won both of his singles matches as Germany won the tie 5–0. He did not participate in the finals in November, in which Germany lost in the quarterfinals.

Hopman Cup
Zverev represented Germany at the Hopman Cup for four consecutive years from 2016 through 2019 with three different partners. In 2016, he competed with Sabine Lisicki. The duo won their tie against the French team, with Zverev winning both his singles and mixed doubles matches. However, they were shut out against Great Britain and Australia Green and did not advance to the final. The following year, he entered the competition with Andrea Petkovic. While the pair only won their tie against Great Britain, Zverev also defeated Federer in singles in his first tournament back from injury.

Zverev had much more success in 2018 and 2019 when he paired up with Angelique Kerber. In their first year together, they were able to advance to the final, primarily on the strength of the pair winning all three of their mixed doubles matches. In the final against Switzerland, Zverev lost his singles match to Federer. Although Kerber won her singles match against Belinda Bencic, they lost the decisive mixed doubles rubber. They returned in 2019 and again reached the final to set up a rematch of the previous year's final with Federer and Bencic. In a round-robin group with Australia, France, and Spain, the two of them won all six of their singles matches, but lost two of their three mixed doubles matches against Australia and France. Like the previous year, the final was decided by the mixed doubles match after Federer defeated Zverev and Kerber defeated Bencic. With the Fast4 format, the match went to three sets. In the third set tiebreak, both teams had a match point at 4–4. Switzerland won the point with Federer serving to win the title.

ATP Cup
Zverev represented Germany at the ATP Cup in 2020 and 2021. At the debut of this tournament in 2020, he was on the team with Jan-Lennard Struff, Kevin Krawietz and Andreas Mies. In the group stage, where Germany met Australia, Canada and Greece, Zverev lost all three matches to Alex de Minaur, Denis Shapovalov and Stefanos Tsitsipas respectively.  Germany did not advance to the next phase of the tournament, finishing third in the group.

In 2021, Germany played again with the same lineup as the previous year. In the group they played against Canada and Serbia. Zverev won his first match against Denis Shapovalov.  In their second meeting, he lost in singles to Novak Djokovic, but still played against him and Nikola Ćaćić in doubles while paired with Jan-Lennard Struff. Germany won that meeting, which allowed them to advance from first place in the group to the semifinals. There they ended up against Russia, where Zverev lost his match to Daniil Medvedev.  Germany eventually lost that game 2–1, allowing Russia to advance to the final.

Playing style

Zverev is an aggressive baseliner. He often stands way back behind the baseline and aims to hit powerful groundstrokes either for winners or to wear down his opponent. Although his height slows him down on the court, it also adds to his reach and gives him the ability to get more balls back in play. Novak Djokovic has commented, "He moves well for his height." Zverev can generate a lot of power with both his backhand and forehand. His backhand, in particular, is regarded as his strength and one of the best in the game. He uses a semi-open stance and employs a western grip on his forehand. He has a continental-eastern grip on his backhand. Zverev can also slice his backhands that require a low center of gravity, despite his height.

The year Zverev first broke into the top 20, he was still not one of the better servers on tour, ranking just 38th in serve rating. This was well behind him ranking 18th in return rating, showing that his return game was much stronger than his serving. By 2018, he had improved in both categories, ranking 19th in serve rating and 8th in return rating. Zverev excels in particular at hitting a high percentage of first serves in, landing 64.2% in 2018. In his return game, he had the fifth highest percentage of first serve points won that year at 32.4%. His second serve is much more shaky and exploitable. Zverev hit the most double faults hit on tour in 2016 and 2020. 

Zverev is an all-court player and does not aim to be better on any surface in particular. He has said, "I feel like I can play on all surfaces. I’ve been to two finals or won tournaments on every single surface. I don’t feel like I have to focus on one... I feel like I have good chances at all of them." Toni Nadal, the uncle and coach of Rafael Nadal, has praised his ability on hard courts in particular, saying, "His best surface is, in my eyes, the hard court, because he moves better than he does on clay." Six of Zverev's first ten titles came on hard courts, while the other four were on clay. As of 2020, he has yet to win a title on grass, but has reached two finals and also defeated Federer on that surface.

Zverev has the ability to serve-and-volley as well. His older brother Mischa is regarded as the biggest proponent of this playing style on the modern tour. Although Sascha does not employ this technique as often as his brother, he has shown it can be effective in big matches such as the Madrid Masters final against Dominic Thiem, a player who rarely comes to the net. Zverev's volleying technique is regarded as one of his biggest weaknesses.

Zverev was tall, but skinny and not very muscular when growing up. His fitness trainer Jez Green has focused on making him stronger and set a goal for him to add  of muscle each year. Initially, Zverev had difficulty adjusting to this training style on the court, saying, "I had no idea what was going on in my body," and needed to adapt his shot technique as he became more muscular. Eventually, he improved on the court. Green remarked, "He started to become less wobbly. He started to absorb the power, so when someone hit hard he could hit the ball back and everything locked into place."

Coaching team
Zverev has been coached by his parents since he was very young. His mother was initially his primary coach before his father took over at some point. Zverev made the decision to hire former world No. 1 Juan Carlos Ferrero at the Washington Open in the summer of 2017. He fired Ferrero following the 2018 Australian Open after Ferrero criticized the rest of Zverev's coaching team. Ivan Lendl, another former world No. 1, joined Zverev's team in August 2018. They split up in July 2019 due to disappointing results and personal differences. Zverev has stated that Lendl was more interested in his dog or his golf game than in professional coaching. In 2020, Zverev started to work with former World Number 3 and 2013 French Open Finalist David Ferrer. They announced their split in January 2021.

Zverev's coaching team also includes physio Hugo Gravil. Fitness trainer Jez Green, who previously worked with Andy Murray, also worked with Zverev beginning 2013. Green departed Zverev's team in 2021 after working with him for around seven years.

Personal life

Zverev is known by the nickname "Sascha". He lives in Monte Carlo, Monaco. He grew up in Hamburg and also has spent his winters living in Florida at the Saddlebrook Academy since he was 12 years old. He can speak German, Russian, and English.

Zverev's tennis idol is Roger Federer. Zverev plays other sports in his spare time such as basketball and golf. He is a fan of the Miami Heat in the National Basketball Association (NBA) and Bayern Munich in the Bundesliga. Zverev's best friend on the tour is Brazilian doubles specialist Marcelo Melo, a former French Open and Wimbledon champion.

Zverev has a daughter, born in 2021, with Brenda Patea, an ex-girlfriend.

Since 2021, Zverev has been in a relationship with Sophia Thomalla.

Lawsuit against former agent
Zverev filed a lawsuit against the ACE Group International and its CEO Patricio Apey, accusing them of "unlawful restraint of trade." He argued that the contract between them was oppressive, but eventually agreed to settle the dispute out-of-court before the trial was to commence.

Domestic abuse allegations
In October 2020, Zverev's ex-girlfriend Olga Sharypova, in an article in Racquet magazine by journalist Ben Rothenberg, accused Zverev of physically and emotionally abusing her over the course of their relationship. Sharypova named multiple instances where Zverev allegedly became violent towards her, including punching her in the face during an argument that took place in the pair's hotel room while Zverev was competing at the 2019 Laver Cup. Zverev denied the allegations and issued a statement after Sharypova's initial accusations: "I very much regret that she makes such statements. Because the accusations are simply not true." 

A second article by Rothenberg about the allegations was released on 25 August 2021, this time in Slate magazine. Within a week, following a hearing at a Berlin-based German court, Zverev obtained an injunction against Rothenberg to stop publishing the allegations without more substantial evidence. The German court's decision further stated Zverev's lawyers made a credible argument that the accusations were not true while also stating that the article did not have enough balance so that it does not leave the impression that Zverev was guilty of the acts Sharypova accused him of committing. In response, Slate stated that it stands by the reporting in the article. The online media organization has not removed it from its website nor blocked it from readers in Germany while further protesting that the injunction was obtained without the organization having an opportunity to present evidence, and that they were appealing the decision.

In October 2021, the ATP announced an investigation into the allegations against Zverev, saying in a statement "The allegations raised against Alexander Zverev are serious and we have a responsibility to address them". The ATP chairman Andrea Gaudenzi confirmed in March 2022 that the investigation was still ongoing. Following a 15-month ATP-commissioned investigation conducted by The Lake Forest Group (a third-party consultant working with the ATP’s outside legal counsel, the Florida-based firm Smith Hulsey & Busey), the ATP announced in late January 2023 that they will not punish Zverev due to insufficient evidence to substantiate the allegations.

Career statistics

Grand Slam tournament performance timeline

Current through the 2023 Australian Open.

Grand Slam tournament finals

Singles: 1 (1 runner-up)

Olympic medal finals

Singles: 1 (1 gold medal)

Year–end championships performance timeline

Year-end championship finals

Singles: 2 (2 titles)

Awards and recognition
Zverev has received the following awards:
 German Sportspersonality of the Year (2021)

References

External links

 
 
 
 
 
 

1997 births
Living people
Olympic gold medalists for Germany
Olympic medalists in tennis
Olympic tennis players of Germany
Tennis players at the 2020 Summer Olympics
Medalists at the 2020 Summer Olympics
Australian Open (tennis) junior champions
German expatriates in Monaco
German male tennis players
German people of Russian descent
Grand Slam (tennis) champions in boys' singles
Hopman Cup competitors
Tennis players from Hamburg
People with type 1 diabetes